Stow of Wedale, or more often Stow,  is a village in the Scottish Borders area of Scotland (historically Midlothian),  north of Galashiels. In the 2011 Census the population was 718. It is served by Stow railway station.

The name
The name Stow is an Old English word stōw meaning 'holy place' or 'meeting place', whilst Wedale is probably derived from the words wēoh (or wīg) meaning 'shrine' and dæl meaning 'valley'.

History
There has been a church at Stow since the 7th century, but the earliest example still visible today was built in the late 15th century on the site of the Church of St Mary which was consecrated on 3 November 1242. The church used today, St Mary of Wedale, was built in 1876 and features a 140-foot-high clock tower.

A rare example of a packhorse bridge, built in the 1650s, can be found in Stow.

Stow of Wedale Town Hall was completed in 1857.

In 1870, James Thin purchased a plot of land in the village and had a house built which was completed in 1873 and was named Ashlea. This house is still a private residence but is not owned by the Thin family.

Famous residents
Sir John Rose Cormack (1815–1882), born and raised in Stow
Sir Walter Mercer FRSE (1890–1971) orthopaedic surgeon

Gallery

See also
Addinston, Carcant
List of places in the Scottish Borders
List of places in Scotland
Stow railway station

References

Sources
E-book on "Celtic Saints and Ancient churches of Strathearn
RCAHMS record of Stow, Wedale View, General
RCAHMS/Canmore record of Old Stow Kirk and Churchyard
Scottish Churches Architectural Heritage Trust, grants awarded
PDF: An excavation at the Bishop's House, Stow, Scottish Borders

 
Ordnance Gazetteer of Scotland (extracts). 
Killochyett: Stow of Wedale
A History of Stow Church
Pictures around Stow

Villages in the Scottish Borders
Parishes formerly in Midlothian